Godwin Kwesi Blay Ekra Jnr(born March 7, 1990) known by the showbiz name Qwasi Blay Jnr., is a Ghanaian actor. He is best known for his roles in the films Dance with the Devil, Grey Dust and 2 Days After Friday. He has been featured in fifteen movies and four TV series.

Early life
He was born in Ghana as the third child in a family with five siblings: four males and a female. He completed primary and junior higher education at Great Lamptey Mills. Then he continued education from Aburi Secondary Technical (SHS). He took his tertiary education at the Koforidua Technical University and obtained a Higher National Diploma (HND) in Purchasing and Supply.

Career
He started acting career in 2016 as a child, appearing in Grey Dust, Grilled, and serial Deju Vu. He received the Best Entertainment Male honor at the tertiary level and best male entertainment act at the maiden edition of the Social Media Entertainment awards. He was later nominated for the Best Performance in a leading role at The 9th edition of the Ghana Movie Awards for the role in the film Adoma.

Qwasi has been nominated for the 2021 Ghana Movie Awards as the "Best Performance By An Actor In A Leading Role" in his lead role in the movie Cross.

Filmography

Awards and nominations

References

External links
 

Living people
21st-century Ghanaian male actors
1998 births
Ghanaian film actors
21st-century Ghanaian male singers
21st-century Ghanaian singers